Patrik Vajda (born 20 March 1989) is a Slovak footballer who plays as a defender for MFK Zvolen.

External links
Futbalnet profile 
FK Dukla profile 

1989 births
Living people
Slovak footballers
FK Dukla Banská Bystrica players
FK Železiarne Podbrezová players
Győri ETO FC players
Association football defenders
Slovak Super Liga players
2. Liga (Slovakia) players
Nemzeti Bajnokság II players
Sportspeople from Banská Bystrica